The following is the list of awards and nominations received by Helen Hunt throughout her career.

Academy Awards

American Comedy Awards

BAFTA Awards

Critics' Choice Awards

Primetime Emmy Awards

Golden Globe Awards

Hollywood Film Awards

Independent Spirit Awards

MTV Movie and TV Awards

People's Choice Awards

Satellite Awards

Saturn Awards

Screen Actors Guild Awards

Notes

Hunt, Helen